Walter Bernard Smith (26 March 1912 – 3 October 1987) was a Liberal party member of the House of Commons of Canada. He was born in Hemmingford, Quebec and became a customs officer and merchant by career.

He was first elected at the Saint-Jean riding in
the 1968 general election. Smith was re-elected in the 1972 and 1974 federal elections, then left federal politics after completing his term in the 30th Parliament.

External links
 

1912 births
1987 deaths
Members of the House of Commons of Canada from Quebec
Liberal Party of Canada MPs